Clavilispinus exiguus is a species of unmargined rove beetle in the family Staphylinidae. It is found in Africa, Australia, the Caribbean Sea, Central America, North America, Oceania, South America, and Southern Asia.

References

Further reading

 
 

Osoriinae
Articles created by Qbugbot
Beetles described in 1840